Empire.Kred is an online game for building real world Influence.

Players buy and sell each other, and earn currency by completing real world Social Missions.

Gameplay 
Players choose their own username (called a ticker) and activate their own portfolio in a virtual economy. The price of a player's shares depends on their stock market and social networking activity. Players can invest in and have their shares bought by other players, which will garner them a higher share price. Players are awarded Achievements for their actions, such as advertising and connecting social identities such as Twitter. Players gain dividends from the other shares in players they invest in, which are counted as virtual currency (called Eaves).

Social networks supported by Empire.Kred currently include Facebook, Twitter, Flickr, YouTube, LinkedIn, Foursquare, Instagram, Google Plus WordPress hosted blogs and the player's own blog and RSS feeds.

Virtual currency 

Empire.Kred uses a virtual currency called Eaves as a means of purchasing shares in other players, additional rights within the exchange, advertising and services. The currency can be purchased with real-world currency via PayPal or Stripe, but cannot be exchanged for real-world currency. A second virtual currency called Vees acted as Empire.Kred's rewards points system which users either purchased from the game's store or earned from companies and individuals who sent out Vees Missions. Vees were recently retired. Remaining vees in the possession of players were donated back to the game, and in exchange Empire.Kred made a greater than $1000 donation to the World Cancer Research Fund.

API 

The Empire.Kred Application Programming Interface (API) allows for third party developers to develop applications to work alongside and extend Empire.Kred. Tools that have been developed along these lines include "Avenue.io", an application that allows players to carry out bulk investments, among other things.

Empire Avenue and PeopleBrowsr Acquisition 
Empire.Kred, formerly named Empire Avenue, was acquired by PeopleBrowsr Pty Ltd on September 3, 2015. PeopleBrowsr has renamed and progressively adapted the game to complement its Kred Influence Platform suite of products. Empire Avenue was officially launched to the public in July 2010.

See also
 Investment Game

References

External links 
 Official Empire.Kred website
 EAV API Documentation

Browser-based multiplayer online games
Social casual games
Virtual economies
Video games developed in Canada
Companies based in Edmonton
2010 video games